The Gettysburg Electric Railway was a borough trolley that provided summer access to Gettysburg Battlefield visitor attractions such as military engagement areas, monuments, postbellum camps, and recreation areas (e.g., Wheat-field Park and the Pfeffer baseball diamond). Despite the 1896 Supreme Court ruling under the Takings Clause against the railway, battlefield operations continued until 1916. The trolley generating plant was leased by the Electric Light, Heat, and Power Company of Gettysburg to supply streetlights and homes until electricity was imported from Hanover.

Employees included superintendent Hal J. Gintling, managers Thomas P. Turner & Harry Cunningham; crewmen Charles W Culp Jr, Mr. Grinder, William Shields, George Hughes, Norman Murray, Reuben Rupp, Walter Plank, Harry Robinson; conductors John Thomas, William G. Weaver, & Edward Weikert; and motormen Warfield Collins, Mr. Emmons, Gervus W. Myers, Arthur "Ott" Shields, & S. A. Troxell.


History

The Gettysburg Electric Railway Company was chartered August 4, 1891, and incorporated July 28, 1892. In January 1893 the borough of Gettysburg granted trolley right-of-way for all principal streets, and the $150,000 bond was for street operations planned for July 1, 1893. The railway eventually secured rights-of-way for a route west and north of the borough to the area of the Battle of Gettysburg, First Day; but which were never built.

Railbed construction began in April 1893, and the electric power company was chartered on June 15. Tracks were planned along The Angle's stone wall, but instead the trolley used  of the Emmitsburg Road on which trolleys crossed the Round Top Branch (the trolley was denied right-of-way on the steam train line in both 1893 and 1913.) Beginning April 1, 1894, the trolley was extended from Wible's Woods through Tipton Station to Round Top Station (the line had 7 stops). The 1896 Supreme Court ruled in US v. Gett. Elec. Ry. Co. that the use of eminent domain for historic preservation "seems" to be "a public use".

Accidents and incidents
In 1900, the trolley overhead power line broke at Wible's Woods, and a car derailed in 1901 (trolley machinery was improved in 1902 before Camp Lawton). Events in 1903 included an attempted derailment by sabotage, a moterman struck his head against "an electric pole that was close to the track", and the "Slocum" trolley car jumped the tracks on April 27. A 1904 trolley struck Joseph Keagy, and during both 1904 and the 1908 Camp Hays, lightning storms disabled trolley operations (a Major was struck getting on a car). In 1909 the "Reynolds" car collided with an automobile, and on August 12, 1910, a car struck a mounted Camp Gobin lieutenant. Three days later the "Slocum" and 1909 closed "Sedgwick" cars collided (1 fatality) near Devil's Den where there was a siding. A heated winter car with a closed vestibule was acquired in December 1910. During the July 1913 Gettysburg reunion, 2 trolley cars collided near Devil's Den, and in September a trolley in the borough was rear-ended when a "drunken passenger" pulled the brake cable.

The last trolley car ran in November 1916 when the railway had become obsolete both with disrepair and with increased tourists' use of automobiles on Army-improved battlefield avenues. After 1917 Army appropriations, the tracks were removed by summer crews under foreman Hugh McIlhenny; and plans for trolley extensions from Gettysburg were never completed to several cities:
west to the Chambersburg & Caledonia trolley line
north to Carlisle via the Mt. Holly and Gettysburg Street Railway Co (Mt. Holly Trolley Co.),
northeast to Harrisburg via the Dillsburg, York Springs and Gettysburg Street Railway, and south through Whitehall to connect both
east to Philadelphia via the Littlestown line through Hanover (cf. Hanover and McSherrystown Street Railway) and
south to Baltimore via Union Mills, Maryland.

The trolley barn ("track car house") at the SE corner of Washington St and the steamtrain tracks was taken over by the Surefoot Heel and Rubber Co. in 1920. A pedestrian bridge was later constructed across Rose Run on the trolley rail trail between Brooke and De Trobriand avenues. Remnants of the trolley system were registered as historic district contributing structures of the Gettysburg Battlefield Historic District on January 23, 2004; and sections of the railbed remain discernable in modern overhead images.

References

Defunct Pennsylvania railroads
Gettysburg, Pennsylvania
Gettysburg Battlefield
History of Adams County, Pennsylvania
Tram, urban railway and trolley companies
Railway companies established in 1891
Railway lines opened in 1893
Railway lines closed in 1916
1891 establishments in Pennsylvania